Huarochirí Province (in hispanicized spelling) or Waruchiri is located in the Lima Region of Peru. Its capital is Matucana. The western section is part of the Lima Metropolitan Area.

Geography 
The La Viuda and Paryaqaqa or Waruchiri mountain ranges and the Cordillera de la Corte traverse the province. Other mountains are listed below:

Political division
The province is divided into thirty-two districts.

 Matucana (Matucana) (seat)
 Antioquia (Antioquia)
 Callahuanca (Callahuanca)
 Carampoma (Carampoma)
 Chicla (Chicla)
 Cuenca (San José de los Chorillos)
 Huachupampa (San Lorenzo de Huachupampa)
 Huanza (Huanza)
 Huarochirí (Huarochirí)
 Lahuaytambo (Lahuaytambo)
 Langa (Langa)
 Laraos (Laraos)
 Mariatana (Mariatana)
 Ricardo Palma (Ricardo Palma)
 San Andrés de Tupicocha (San Andrés de Tupicocha)
 San Antonio (Chaclla)
 San Bartolome (San Bartolome)
 San Damian (San Damian)
 San Juan de Iris (San Juan de Iris)
 San Juan de Tantaranche (San Juan de Tantaranche)
 San Lorenzo de Quinti (San Lorenzo de Quinti)
 San Mateo (San Mateo)
 San Mateo de Otao (San Juan de Lanca)
 San Pedro de Casta (San Pedro de Casta)
 San Pedro de Huancayre (San Pedro)
 Sangallaya (Sangallaya)
 Santa Cruz de Cocachacra (Cocachacra)
 Santa Eulalia (Santa Eulalia)
 Santiago de Anchucaya (Santiago de Anchucaya)
 Santiago de Tuna (Santiago de Tuna)
 Santo Domingo de los Olleros (Santo Domingo de los Olleros)
 Surco (Surco)

See also
 Antaqucha
 Pukaqucha
 P'itiqucha (Huanza)
 P'itiqucha (Quinti)
 Qiwllaqucha
 Tiktiqucha
 Wachwaqucha
 Wamp'arqucha
 Huarochirí Manuscript
 Yuraqmayu

References 

Provinces of the Lima Region